Kurt Lubinski (October 19, 1899 – 1969) was a German and Dutch photojournalist. He worked for the Ullstein Verlag in the late 1920s, emigrated to The Netherlands in 1933 and to the United States in 1943. He worked for Dutch illustrated weeklies such as Het Leven where he was an early photojournalist who traveled through the remote areas of the former Soviet Union and Ethiopia. His unusual subject matter—people from rarely-photographed cultures, lions riding in sidecars, people behaving oddly in public places—gave him the reputation of being "among the first to acquaint the general public with images of strange cultures and exotic peoples."

Personal life
He was married to photographer Margot Lewin-Richter in 1927 and later divorced. They had one son, Peter, in 1931. Margot and Peter changed their last name to Lucas when they emigrated to the U.S.

Published works

References

Dutch photojournalists
1899 births
1969 deaths